The District Council (Second) functional constituency was a functional constituency in the elections for the Legislative Council of Hong Kong which was created in the 2012 constitutional reform package. It was the largest functional constituency consisted of registered voters who were not eligible for voting in the other functional constituencies.

Background

In 2009, the government put forward the reform package of the election method of the 5th Legislative Council of Hong Kong in the 2012 LegCo election. Due to the resolution of the National People's Congress in 2007 the ratio of geographical constituency and functional constituency remained the same, the government's package suggested to add extra five seats in geographical constituency and functional constituency respectively. The five new functional constituency seats would be same as the District Council functional constituency, in which only district councillors could stand, nominate, and be elected.

The Democratic Party put forward a revised proposal that kept the restriction of candidates for the new District Council constituency to elected district councillors, but expanded the electorate to all registered voters in Hong Kong. The Democratic Party's proposal was accepted by the central authorities. In 2010, the LegCo passed the Consultation Document on the Methods for Selecting the Chief Executive and for Forming the LegCo in 2012 and the total 10 new seats in the sum of 5 seats of geographical constituencies and 5 seats of District Council (Second) functional constituency were created in the following 2012 LegCo election in September.

Electoral method
Only elected members of the District Councils can become nominees and nominate candidates. Nominees have to get at least 15 nominations in order to run and are elected by all registered voters anywhere in Hong Kong who fulfill both of the requirements below:

 The voter does not belong to any other functional constituency, regardless of whether that constituency is contested or not in the election, and
 The voter did not request not to be registered for the District Council (Second) constituency when he or she registered as a voter or updated his or her information.

Since its voters are not part of the other functional constituencies, the District Council (Second) constituency is considered a de facto direct election and so the members elected are called the "Super District Councillors" or "5 Super Seats". The constituency is elected using proportional representation with the largest remainder method.

The constituency covers all regions of Hong Kong.

Returned members

Summary of seats won

Vote share summary

Electoral results

See also
Legislative Council of Hong Kong
2016 Hong Kong legislative election

References

Constituencies of Hong Kong
Constituencies of Hong Kong Legislative Council
Functional constituencies (Hong Kong)
2012 establishments in Hong Kong
Constituencies established in 2012
2021 disestablishments in Hong Kong
Constituencies disestablished in 2021